Second Movement is an album by American jazz saxophonist Eddie Harris and pianist/vocalist Les McCann recorded in 1971 and released on the Atlantic label. The album was a follow-up to the duo's highly successful live collaboration Swiss Movement  (Atlantic, 1969).

Reception

The Allmusic review called the album "a gem that continues to inspire a new generation of soul/jazz musicians".

Track listing
All compositions by Eddie Harris except as indicated
 "Shorty Rides Again" (Harris, Les McCann) - 8:31 
 "Universal Prisoner" (Harris, McCann) - 5:00 
 "Carry on Brother" - 7:11 
 "Set Us Free" - 10:26 
 "Samia" (McCann) - 7:32

Personnel
Eddie Harris - tenor saxophone
Les McCann - electric piano, vocals
Cornell Dupree - electric guitar
Jimmy Rowser - bass
Jerry Jemmott - electric bass (tracks 1-3)
Donald Dean - drums
Buck Clarke - African drums, percussion
Bernard Purdie - tambourine, drums
Judy Clay, Cissy Houston, Rennelle Stafford, Deidre Tuck - vocals
Unidentified string section arranged by Arif Mardin (track 2)
Unidentified horns and woodwinds (tracks 4 & 5)

References 

Eddie Harris albums
Les McCann albums
1971 albums
Atlantic Records albums
Albums arranged by Arif Mardin
Albums produced by Arif Mardin